The General That Never Was is a Hong Kong martial arts and fantasy television show that was broadcast on TVB in 1985. It has two sequels: General Father and General Son. this story is based from the life of Sit Yan Kwai.

1985 Hong Kong television series debuts
TVB dramas
1980s Hong Kong television series
Cantonese-language television shows